Fuke Tongjing Wan is a vermillion waxed pill with yellowish-brown core used in Traditional Chinese medicine to "remove blood stasis and emmenagogue, to alleviate mental depression, and to relieve pain". It tastes slightly salty. It is used where there is "dysmenorrhea, amenorrhea, distension in the chest and diaphragm, distension and pain at loins and abdomen due to the stagnation of qi and blood". It is typically taken with millet soup or yellow rice wine in the morning before breakfast, and is contraindicated in pregnancy and in patients with amenorrheal abdominalgia or loose stool due to deficiency in qi and blood.

Chinese classic herbal formula

See also
 Chinese classic herbal formula
 Bu Zhong Yi Qi Wan

References

Traditional Chinese medicine pills